Hagenella is a genus of insects belonging to the family Phryganeidae.

The species of this genus are found in Europe, Easternmost Asia and Northern America.

Species:
 Hagenella apicalis (Matsumura, 1904)
 Hagenella canadensis (Banks, 1907)

References

Phryganeidae
Trichoptera genera